Carla Morrow is an American artist specializing in watercolor fantasy dragons.  She is also known as The Dragon Lady.

Career
Morrow grew up in Las Cruces, New Mexico from a family of artists including two grandmothers, aunts, uncles, and mother-in-law.  As a freelance traditional artist she began with prismacolor and alcohol based markers, but then taught herself colored pencil and finally watercolor.  In addition, she has produced some wildlife pencil drawings.  Her line of "Little Wings Dragons" began in 2008.

References

Fantasy artists
American speculative fiction artists
21st-century American painters
Artists from New Mexico
Living people
1981 births
People from Las Cruces, New Mexico
American women painters
21st-century American women artists